Chistye Prudy or Chistyye Prudy may refer to:

 Clean Ponds, a pond in Moscow, Russia
 Chistyye Prudy (Moscow Metro), a station on the Sokolnicheskaya Line
 Chistye Prudy, Kaliningrad Oblast, a rural locality (settlement) in Kaliningrad Oblast, Russia
 Chistye Prudy, Bashkortostan, a rural locality in Bashkortostan, Russia
 "Chistye Prudy" (song), a song composed by David Tukhmanov and performed by Igor Talkov
 Clean Ponds (film), a 1965 Soviet drama film